Aerenomera is a genus of beetles in the family Cerambycidae, containing the following species:

 Aerenomera boliviensis Gilmour, 1962
 Aerenomera spilas Martins, 1984

References

Aerenicini